Festival (initially titled Festival '61) is a Canadian entertainment anthology television series which aired on CBC Television from 1960 to 1969.

Premise
CBC Television aired dramatic and musical anthology series such as Scope and Folio during the 1950s. Robert Allen, a producer on Folio, became supervising producer of the new Festival series.

Production
The production cost of a typical Festival drama show was approximately $45,000 in 1961, among the highest production costs of CBC programming at the time. Productions such as a ballet performance or a Gilbert and Sullivan play could cost $60,000 for CBC.

Scheduling
This series was broadcast as follows:

Seasons

1960-61

Festival was pre-empted some weeks with such programming as specials from the Omnibus or Hall of Fame series, or by sports (hockey, football), or by other special programs.

1961-62

The program was simply billed as Festival in its second season. Most pre-empted weeks were for special episodes of Camera Canada.

1962-63

Weeks not indicated were pre-empted by special broadcasts such as Camera Canada or The Telephone Hour. National election coverage pre-empted Festival on 8 April 1963.

1963-64

Weeks not indicated were pre-empted by special broadcasts such as Camera Canada, Horizon or Intertel. NHL hockey playoffs pre-empted Festival on 8 April 1964.

References

External links
 

CBC Television original programming
1960 Canadian television series debuts
1969 Canadian television series endings
1960s Canadian anthology television series